The Frauen DFB-Pokal 2004–05 was the 25th season of the cup competition, Germany's second-most important title in women's football. It was the last time the cup was held over five rounds and also the last time, that clubs were allowed to have more than one side in the tournament. The first round of the competition was held on 28–29 August 2004. In the final which was held in Berlin on 29 April 2006 Turbine Potsdam faced FFC Frankfurt as in the previous year and again Turbine won 3–0, thus claiming their second title.

1st round

2nd round

Quarter-finals

Semi-finals

Final

DFB-Pokal Frauen seasons
Pokal
Fra